Kaneez Fatima is an Indian politician who is the current MLA from the Gulbarga North constituency of the Karnataka Legislative Assembly. She was the wife of a former minister, the late Qamar-ul-Islam who was also MLA from the same constituency in 2013.

Constituency 
She represents Gulbarga Uttar (Vidhana Sabha constituency) of the Karnataka Legislative Assembly.

Political career 
Fathima Kaneez is a member of Indian National Congress (INC) political party. After the passing away of Dr Qamar ul Islam, Fatima had initially refused to contest but was persuaded by Siddaramaiah, Mallikarjun Kharge and G.Parameshwar. Besides people of all communities convinced her to contest. Many Gulbarga leaders from Congress MLA Priyank Kharge, MLA Ajay Singh, Wahed Ali Fatehakhani, Baba Nazar Mohammed Khan, ex-HKE President Basavaraj Bhimalli, etc. supported her and more than sympathy, the election campaign was done by highlighting the contributions of her husband Qamar-ul-Islam and won the election against Nasir Hussain Ustad of JD(s) and Chandrakanth Patil of BJP by 5,940 votes.

CAA Protest 
A massive protest, the largest in North Karnataka, took place in the town of Kalaburagi against the Citizenship Amendment Act (CAA). Around 15,000 people gathered for a protest march and came out defying the Section 144 notification that was imposed on the entire state of Karnataka. MLA Kaneez Fathima was the major catalyst in mobilising citizens. All local Congress Corporators reportedly came out in support of the protest.

Controversy 
Kaneez Fatima had purchased 22 acres of agricultural land near Gulbarga. S K Kantha, the former minister, had filed a complaint alleging that the purchase was illegal and violated Karnataka Land Reforms Act, 1961. The Act prohibits the purchase of agricultural land by any person other than an agriculturist. The Gulbarga tahsildar, in his report to the Assistant Commissioner, stated that Qamar ul Islam runs schools and owns commercial complexes and hence the income of Fatima exceeded Rs two lakh per annum. The Assistant Commissioner set aside the purchase of land by Fatima with an observation that the purchaser had violated the provisions of the Karnataka Land Reforms Act. He has directed the tahsildar to take over the land and mention Karnataka Government as the owner of the land.

References 

Karnataka MLAs 2018–2023
Indian National Congress politicians from Karnataka
Living people
Kalaburagi
1959 births